James Raymond Gilhula (June 14, 1912 – March 11, 1962) was an American competition swimmer who represented the United States at the 1932 Summer Olympics in Los Angeles, California.  Gilhula competed in the semifinals of the 400-meter freestyle, placing fourth with a time of 4:55.4.

References

1912 births
1962 deaths
American male freestyle swimmers
Olympic swimmers of the United States
Swimmers at the 1932 Summer Olympics
20th-century American people